Phycita is a genus of small moths belonging to the snout moth family (Pyralidae). They are the type genus of their tribe Phycitini and of the huge snout moth subfamily Phycitinae.

The type species of this widespread genus is Phycita roborella, under its obsolete name Tinea spissicella. This is believed by many authors to have been described in Johan Christian Fabricius' Entomologia systematica in the 1790s. However, it appears that Fabricius described the species in his 1776/1777 Genera insectorum already. Fabricius himself established the present genus under the name Phycis.

But this name had already been used for a genus of northern hakes by Peter Artedi in his catalogue of fishes (Petri Artedi sueci genera piscium), edited and published posthumously by Johann Julius Walbaum in 1792. When this name was replaced, Fabricius' earlier description of the type species was overlooked, eventually rendering it a nomen oblitum. In any case, the same moth had been first described as Phalaena (Tinea) roborella by Michael Denis and Ignaz Schiffermüller in 1775, and thus their species name has priority over that of Fabricius. Replacement names for Fabricius' Phycis were proposed at almost the same time in 1828 by John Curtis and Ludwig Thienemann, but the latter's proposal Ceratium was also unavailable, having been established for a dinoflagellate genus by Franz von Paula Schrank in 1793. To add further confusion, some authors have claimed that Ceratium was again established for the present genus in 1848 by Johannes von Nepomuk Franz Xaver Gistel, but this is not correct – Gistel merely discussed Thienemann's and v. Schrank's names and (unnecessarily) proposed Gyra to replace the latter, adding yet another invalid name to the synonymy of Phycita.

Phycita species can be hard to tell apart from related moths in the field. The combination of 11 veins in the forewing (vein 7 missing altogether) and an upward-pointing "snout" formed by the long and straight labial palps, whose second segment is much longer than the third, may be diagnostic. The caterpillar's food plants are not comprehensively documented, but seem to include trees of the eurosids I clade and perhaps others.

Selected species
Species of Phycita include:

 Phycita aceris Schernijazova, 1974
 Phycita amygdali Schernijazova, 1974
 Phycita arabica Asselbergs, 2008
 Phycita caiella de Joannis, 1913
 Phycita characterica Asselbergs, 2009
 Phycita clientella Zeller, 1867
 Phycita coronatella (Guenée, 1845)
 Phycita demidovi Guillermet, 2007
 Phycita diaphana (Staudinger, 1870)
 Phycita eulepidella Hampson, 1896
 Phycita fuscopilella Chrétien
 Phycita hyssarica Schernijazova, 1974
 Phycita macrodontella (Ragonot, 1887)
 Phycita meliella
 Phycita metzneri (Zeller, 1846)
 Phycita nephodeella Ragonot, 1887
 Phycita orthoclina (Meyrick, 1929)
 Phycita pectinicornella Fryer, 1912
 Phycita pedisignella Ragonot, 1887
 Phycita poteriella (Zeller, 1846)
 Phycita rhapta (Turner, 1947)
 Phycita roborella (Denis & Schiffermüller, 1775)
 Phycita strigata (Staudinger, 1879)
 Phycita torrenti Agenjo, 1962
 Phycita trachystola Turner, 1904
 Phycita venalbellus (de Joannis, 1922)

Footnotes

References

  (1986): Pyralidae and Microlepidoptera of the Marquesas Archipelago. Smithsonian Contributions to Zoology 416: 1-485. PDF (214 MB!)
  (2004): Butterflies and Moths of the World, Generic Names and their Type-species – Phycita. Version of 5 November 2004. Retrieved 27 May 2011.
  (2011): Markku Savela's Lepidoptera and Some Other Life Forms – Phycita. Version of 6 March 2011. Retrieved 27 May 2011.

Phycitini
Pyralidae genera